Refik is a masculine given name of Arabic origin meaning friend, associate, husband, companion or fellow. It may refer to:
Refik Durbaş (1944–2018), Turkish poet, writer
Ahmet Refik Altınay (1881–1937), Ottoman historian, writer and poet
Refik Erduran (1928–2017), Turkish playwright, columnist and writer
Refik Halili, Albanian businessman
Refik Halit Karay (1888–1965), Turkish writer and journalist
Refik Kolić (born 1965), Bosnian folk music singer
Refik Koraltan (1889–1974, Turkish politician
Refik Kozić (born 1950), Yugoslav footballer
Refik Memišević (1956–2004), Yugoslav Olympian wrestler
Refik Resmja(1931–1997), Albanian footballer
Refik Šabanadžović (born 1965), Yugoslav footballer
Refik Saydam (1881–1942), Turkish politician and prime minister
Refik Osman Top (1897–1957), Turkish footballer, referee, coach and sports columnist